Abū Zakariyyā Yaḥyā ibn Sharaf al-Nawawī (‎ (631A.H-676A.H)  (October 1230–21 December 1277), popularly known as al-Nawawī or Imam Nawawī, was a Sunni Shafi'ite jurist and hadith scholar. Al-Nawawi died at the relatively early age of 45. Despite this, he authored numerous and lengthy works ranging from hadith, to theology, biography, and jurisprudence that are still read to this day.

Early life

Background
He was born at Nawa near Damascus, Syria. As with Arabic and other Semitic languages, the last part of his name refers to his hometown.

Yasin bin Yusuf Marakashi, says: "I saw Imam Nawawi at Nawa when he was a youth of ten years of age. Other boys of his age used to force him to play with them, but Imam Nawawi would always avoid the play and would remain busy with the recitation of the Noble Qur'an. When they tried to domineer and insisted on his joining their games, he bewailed and expressed his no concern over their foolish action. On observing his sagacity and profundity, a special love and affection developed in my heart for young Nawawi. I approached his teacher and urged him to take exceptional care of this lad as he was to become a great religious scholar. His teacher asked whether I was a soothsayer or an astrologer. I told him I am neither soothsayer nor an astrologer but Allah caused me to utter these words." His teacher conveyed this incident to Imam's father and in keeping in view the learning quest of his son, decided to dedicate the life of his son for the service and promotion of the cause of Islam.

Life as a scholar
He studied in Damascus from the age of 18 and after making the pilgrimage in 1253, he settled there as a private scholar.

Notable teachers
During his stay at Damascus, he studied from more than twenty teachers who were regarded as masters and authority of their subject field and disciplines they taught. An-Nawawi studied Hadith, Islamic Jurisprudence, its principles, syntax and Etymology. His teachers included Abu Ibrahim Ishaq bin Ahmad AI-Maghribi, Abu Muhammad Abdur-Rahman bin Ibrahim Al-Fazari, Radiyuddin Abu Ishaq Ibrahim bin Abu Hafs Umar bin Mudar Al-Mudari, Abu Ishaq Ibrahim bin Isa Al-Muradi, Abul-Baqa Khalid bin Yusuf An-Nablusi, Abul-Abbas Ahmad bin Salim Al-Misri, Abu Abdullah Al-Jiyani, Abul-Fath Umar bin Bandar, Abu Muhammad At-Tanukhi, Sharafuddin Abdul-Aziz bin Muhammad Al-Ansari, Abul-Faraj Abdur-Rahman bin Muhammad bin Ahmad Al-Maqdisi, and Abul-Fada'il Sallar bin Al-Hasan Al Arbali among others.

Creed 
He did ta'wil on some of the Qur'an verses and ahadith on the attributes of Allah. He states in his commentary of a hadith that:

Relationship with the Mamluk Sultanate 
Nawawi drew the ire of Mamluk Sultan Rukn al-Din Baybars twice. Once when he wrote on behalf of residents of Damascus that if Baybars do not stop taxing people illegally then Allah will tax his deed in al-akhira who sought relief from heavy tax burdens during a drought that lasted many years. This prompted Baybars to threaten to expel him from Damascus. To this, he responded:"As for myself, threats do not harm me or mean anything to me. They will not keep me from advising the ruler, for I believe that this is obligatory upon me and others."

Second time Nawawi addressed Sultan Baybars when he wanted the ulama to issue  fatwa that waqf belongs to the ruler which originally belonged to Muslim society. An-Nawawi sort of scolded him to fear Allah and control his greed for wealth. to which Sultan Baybars agreed. Some people asked Baybars why he did not lock up an-Nawawi to which Baybars replied whenever he even thinks of locking an-Nawawi up, a kind of fear flows through his heart. Both time Baybars abided by an-Nawawi's letters.

Death and legacy
He died at Nawa at the relatively young age of 45.

An-Nawawi's lasting legacy is his contribution to hadith literature through his momentous works Forty Hadiths and Riyadh as-Saaliheen. This made him respected in all madhabs, despite of him being of Shafi'i jurisprudence. According to Al-Dhahabi, Imam Nawawi's concentration and absorption in academic love gained proverbial fame. He had devoted all his time for learning and scholarship. Other than reading and writing, he spent his time contemplating on the interacted and complex issues and in finding their solutions. Ulama's praise him for 3 characteristics:

 His level of scholarship. Writing more than 40 pages daily from age 18-45. Studying continuously for 12 hours and then teaching for another 12 hours at age 18-20 in Damascus. 
 His asceticism. Not marrying in fear of faltering his wife's right, lack of love for dunya, constant worshipping of Allah, constant zikr.
 His keenness in enjoining good and forbidding evil. As done with Sultan al-Baibars.

Destruction of tomb
In 2015, during the ongoing Syrian Civil War, his tomb was demolished by rebels linked to Al Nusra.

Works 
During his life of 45 years he wrote "at least fifty books" on Islamic studies and other topics. Some scholar counted pages he written and calculated that he wrote 40+ pages daily from age 18 till his death. Some his writings is still reached vastly as no author has superseded him in those writing. These include:
 Al Minhaj bi Sharh Sahih Muslim, making use of others before him, and is considered one of the best commentaries on Sahih Muslim. It is available online.
 Riyadh as-Saaliheen; collection of hadith on ethics, manners, conduct, popular in the Muslim world.
 al-Majmu' sharh al-Muhadhab, is a comprehensive manual of Islamic law according to the Shafi'i school has been edited with French translation by van den Bergh, 2 vols., Batavia (1882–1884), and published at Cairo (1888).
 Minhaj al-Talibin, a classical manual on Islamic Law according to Shafi'i fiqh.
 Tahdhib al-Asma wa'l-Lughat,  edited as the Biographical Dictionary of Illustrious Men chiefly at the Beginning of Islam (Arabic) by F. Wüstenfeld (Göttingen, 1842–1847).
 Taqrib al-Taisir, an introduction to the study of hadith, it is an extension of Ibn al-Salah's Muqaddimah, was published at Cairo, 1890, with Suyuti's commentary "Tadrib al-Rawi". It has been in part translated into French by W. Marçais in the Journal asiatique, series ix., vols. 16–18 (1900–1901).
 al-Arbaʿīn al-Nawawiyya - 'Forty Hadiths,' collection of forty-two fundamental traditions, frequently published along with numerous commentaries.
 Ma Tamas ilayhi hajat al-Qari li Saheeh al-Bukhaari
 Tahrir al-Tanbih
 Kitab al-Adhkar; collection of supplications of prophet Muhammad.
 al-Tibyan fi adab Hamalat al-Quran
 Adab al-fatwa wa al-Mufti wa al-Mustafti
 al-Tarkhis fi al-Qiyam
 Manasik on Hajj rituals.
 al-Hatt ala al-Mantiq - 'The Insistence upon Logic,' written to address epistemological and historical criticisms of logic
 Sharh Sunan Abu Dawood
 Sharh Sahih al-Bukhari
 Mukhtasar at-Tirmidhi
 Tabaqat ash-Shafi'iyah
 Rawdhat al-Talibeen
 Bustan al-`arifin
 Al-Maqasid

Recent English language editions
 Bustan al-ʿarifin (The Garden of Gnostics), Translated by Aisha Bewley

Minhaj al-Talibin
Minhaj et talibin: A Manual of Muhammadan Law ; According To The School of Shafi, Law Publishing Co (1977) ASIN B0006D2W9I
Minhaj et talibin: A Manual of Muhammadan Law ; According To The School of Shafi, Navrang (1992) 
Minhaj Et Talibin: A Manual of Muhammadan Law, Adam Publishers (2005)

The Forty Hadith

Al-Nawawi Forty Hadiths and Commentary; Translated by Arabic Virtual Translation Center; (2010) 
Ibn-Daqiq's Commentary on the Nawawi Forty Hadiths; Translated by Arabic Virtual Translation Center; (2011) 
The Compendium of Knowledge and Wisdom; Translation of Jami' Uloom wal-Hikam by Ibn Rajab al-Hanbali translated by Abdassamad Clarke, Turath Publishing (2007) 
Al-Nawawi's Forty Hadith, Translated by  Ezzeddin Ibrahim, Islamic Texts Society; New edition (1997) 
The Forty Hadith of al-Imam al-Nawawi, Abul-Qasim Publishing House (1999) 
The Complete Forty Hadith, Ta-Ha Publishers (2000) 
The Arba'een 40 Ahadith of Imam Nawawi with Commentary, Darul Ishaat
Commentary on the Forty Hadith of Al-Nawawi (3 Vols.), by Jamaal Al-Din M. Zarabozo, Al-Basheer (1999)

Riyad al-Salihin
Gardens of the righteous: Riyadh as-Salihin of Imam Nawawi, Rowman and Littlefield (1975) 
Riyad-us-Salihin: Garden of the Righteous, Dar Al-Kotob Al-Ilmiyah
Riyadh-us-Saliheen (Vol. 1&2 in One Book) (Arabic-English) Dar Ahya Us-Sunnah Al Nabawiya

See also

Forty hadith
Islamic scholars
Imam Shafi'i

References

External links
 Biodata at MuslimScholars.info
 A short bio on Imam Nawawi
 An-Nawawi's Forty Hadiths
 Imam Nawawi

Shafi'is
Asharis
Bibliographers
Hadith scholars
Encyclopedists of the medieval Islamic world
Sunni Muslim scholars of Islam
Sunni fiqh scholars
Sharia judges
Shaykh al-Islāms
Theologians from the Mamluk Sultanate
13th-century jurists
Biographical evaluation scholars
13th-century Muslim scholars of Islam
13th-century biographers
Historians from the Ayyubid Sultanate
13th-century Syrian historians
1234 births
1277 deaths
Supporters of Ibn Arabi